St Wulstan's Roman Catholic Church, Little Malvern, Worcestershire, England is a Benedictine parish church administered by the monks of Downside Abbey. The attached churchyard contains the grave of the composer Edward Elgar and of his wife, Alice. The church was designed in 1862 in a Gothic Revival style by Benjamin Bucknall. It is a Grade II listed building. The Elgars' grave has a separate Grade II listing.

History
The Benedictines established a monastery at what is now Little Malvern Priory in around 1171. After the Dissolution of the Monasteries, the priory was reduced to the chancel and tower, and other elements were converted and reused in the construction of Little Malvern Court. The court came into the possession of the Berington family in the 18th century, who remain its owners. Staunchly recusant, the Beringtons supported a Catholic congregation at Little Malvern and in 1860 engaged the architect Benjamin Bucknall to construct a new church. The church, completed in 1862, was dedicated to St Wulstan.

In 1920 Alice Elgar, wife of the composer Edward Elgar, was buried in the churchyard at St Wulstan's. The church had been the Elgars regular place of worship during their time at Craeg Lea, their home at Malvern Wells. Following his own death in 1932, Elgar himself was interred in the same grave. Their memorial was designed by Arthur Troyte Griffith, a Malvern-based architect and close friend of Elgar, whom Elgar celebrated in Variation VII, “Troyte”, of his Enigma Variations. The composer Dorothy Howell, who for many years tended the Elgar grave on behalf of the Elgar Society, is buried nearby.

The church is now owned and administered by the Benedictine community at Downside Abbey.

Architecture and description
The church is constructed of local Malvern rubble with ashlar stone dressings. It comprises a nave and a chancel. An undercroft designed by Bucknall was never built. The church contains stained glass by Hardman & Co., which, as at 2022, is undergoing a major restoration. St Wulstan's is a Grade II listed building. The Elgars' grave has a separate Grade II listing.

Gallery

Notes

References

Sources

External links
 St Wulstan's Roman Catholic Church website

Roman Catholic churches in Worcestershire
Grade II listed churches in Worcestershire
Grade II listed Roman Catholic churches in England
Gothic Revival church buildings in England
Gothic Revival architecture in Worcestershire
19th-century Roman Catholic church buildings in the United Kingdom
Roman Catholic churches completed in 1862
Edward Elgar